Bilaspur railway division is one of the three railway divisions under South East Central Railway zone of Indian Railways. This railway division was formed on 1 April 1952 and its headquarters is located at Bilaspur in the state of Chhattisgarh of India.

Nagpur SEC railway division and Raipur railway division are the other two railway divisions under SECR Zone headquartered at Bilaspur.

List of railway stations and towns 
The list includes the stations under the Bilaspur railway division and their station category.

References

 
Divisions of Indian Railways
1952 establishments in India

Transport in Bilaspur, Chhattisgarh